Megachile apennina is a species of bee in the family Megachilidae. It was described by Benoist in 1940.

References

Apennina
Insects described in 1940